This is an incomplete list of hospitals in Liberia

Monrovia
 John F. Kennedy Medical Center
Jahmale Medical Solutions
 Eternal Love Winning Africa Hospital
 Redemption Hospital 
 St. Joseph's Catholic Hospital
 Cooper Adventist Hospital
 MSF Pediatric Hospital
 E. S. Grant Mental Health Hospital
 A.M.E. University Clinic
 Hope For Women International Health Center
 James N.Davis Jr. Memorial Hospital (Paynesville)
 Benson Hospital (Paynesville)
 Bensonville Hospital
 Snapper Hill Clinic
Peace Clinic(Old Road _Louisiana)

Elsewhere
 Martha Tubman Memorial Hospital, Zwedru

Lofa County 
 Curran Hospital, Zorzor, Lofa County
 Telewonyan Hospital, Voinjama, Lofa County
 Kolahun hospital, Kolahun, Lofa County
 Borma hospital, Foya, Lofa County

Grand Cape Mount County 
 St. Timothy Memorial Hospital, Robertsport, Grand Cape Mount County

Bomi County 
 Liberia Government Hospital, Tubmanburg, Bomi County

Gbarpolu County 
 Chief Jallalone Memorial Hospital, Bopulu, Gbarpolu County

Grand Bassa County 
 Liberia Government Hospital, Buchanan, Grand Bassa County
 Liberia Agricultural Company (LAC) Hospital, LAC, Grand Bassa County
 Mittal Steel Hospital, Buchanan, Grand Bassa County
 Gbokpasom Medical Center, Robert Street, Buchanan, Grand Bassa County Liberia

Rivercess County 
 St. Francis Hospital, Cestos city, Rivercess County

Margibi County 
 Duside Hospital, Margibi County
 C.H. Rennie Hospital, Kakata, Margibi County

Bong County 
 GW Health Group, Bong County
 Phebe Hospital, Bong County
 Bong Mines Hospital, Bong County
 C.B.Dunbar Memorial Hospital, Gbarnga, Bong County
 Salala Hospital, Salala,Bong County

Nimba County 
 George Way Harley Memorial Hospital, Sanniquellie, Nimba County
 Jackson F. Doe Memorial Regional Referral Hospital, Tappita, Nimba County. 
 Ganta United Methodist Hospital, Ganta, County
 G.W. Harley Memorial Hospital, Saniquelleh, Nimba County
 Zoe Geh Medical Center, Nimba County
 Saclepea Comprehensive Health Center, Saclepea, Nimba
 E&J Hospital
Ganta

Grand Kru County 
 Rally Time Hospital, Grandcess, Grand Kru County
 Domo Nimene Maternity Hospital, Sasstown, Grand Kru County

Sinoe County 
 GW Health Group, Sinoe County
 F.J. Grant Memorial Hospital, Greenville, Sinoe County

Maryland County 
 J.J. Dossen Hospital, Harper, Maryland County
 Cavalla Medical Center, Cavalla, Maryland County
 Pleebo Health Center, Pleebo, Maryland County

See also 
 Health in Liberia

References

 List
Hospitals
Liberia
Liberia